Spigno may refer to the following comuni in Italy:

 Spigno Monferrato, in Piedmont
 Spigno Saturnia, in the Lazio